Volume 1 is a box set by alternative folk singer-songwriter Billy Bragg, released in 2006.  The box set includes 7 CDs and 2 DVDs with a booklet containing song lyrics and an introduction by Wiggy, producer of several of Bragg's albums.

Though Workers Playtime was released in 1988, it has been made part of Volume 2 while The Internationale, which was published in 1990, is the 4th album reprised here, thus, the two sets are not fully chronological.

Track listing 
All songs written by Billy Bragg, except where noted

Disc 1 (Life's a Riot with Spy vs Spy – Original Album)

"The Milkman of Human Kindness" – 2:49
"To Have and to Have Not" – 2:33
"Richard" – 2:51
"A New England" – 2:14
"The Man in the Iron Mask" – 2:13
"The Busy Girl Buys Beauty" – 1:58
"Lovers Town Revisited" – 1:19

Disc 2 (Life's a Riot with Spy vs Spy – Bonus CD)
"Strange Things Happen" (alternative version) – 3:19
"The Cloth I" – 2:50
"Love Lives Here" – 1:42
"Speedway Hero" – 2:39
"Loving You Too Long" – 2:51
"The Guitar Says Sorry" (alternative version) – 2:14
"Love Gets Dangerous" (alternative version) – 2:32
"The Cloth II" – 2:47
"The Man in the Iron Mask" (alternative version) – 2:17
"A13, Trunk Road to the Sea" (music by Bobby Troup, words by Bragg) – 2:27
"Fear Is a Man's Best Friend" (John Cale) – 2:32

Disc 3 (Brewing Up with Billy Bragg – Original Album)
"It Says Here" – 4:18
"Love Gets Dangerous" – 2:23
"The Myth of Trust" – 2:54
"From a Vauxhall Velox" – 2:31
"The Saturday Boy" – 3:30
"Island of No Return" – 3:37
"St Swithin's Day" – 3:54
"Like Soldiers Do" – 2:39
"This Guitar Says Sorry" – 2:31
"Strange Things Happen" – 2:38
"A Lover Sings" – 3:54

Disc 4 (Brewing Up with Billy Bragg – Bonus CD)
"It Must Be a River" – 2:19
"I Won't Talk About It" – 5:06
"Talking Wag Club Blues" – 2:59
"You Got the Power" (James Brown, George Terry) – 3:10
"The Last Time" (Mick Jagger, Keith Richards) – 2:55
"Back to the Old House" (Morrissey, Johnny Marr) – 2:53
"A Lover Sings" (alternative version) – 3:58
"Which Side Are You On?" (Florence Reece, Bragg) – 2:34
"It Says Here" (alternate version) – 2:36
"Between the Wars" – 2:30
"The World Turned Upside Down" (Leon Rosselson) – 2:35

Disc 5 (Talking with the Taxman About Poetry – Original Album)
"Greetings to the New Brunette" – 3:29
"Train Train" (Zenon De Fleur) – 2:11
"The Marriage" – 2:30
"Ideology" (Bragg, Bob Dylan) – 3:27
"Levi Stubbs' Tears" – 3:28
"Honey, I'm a Big Boy Now" – 4:05
"There Is Power in a Union" (Bragg, George Frederick Root) – 2:47
"Help Save the Youth of America" – 2:45
"Wishing the Days Away" – 2:28
"The Passion" – 2:52
"The Warmest Room" – 3:55
"The Home Front" – 4:09

Disc 6 (Talking with the Taxman About Poetry – Bonus CD)
"Sin City" (Gram Parsons, Chris Hillman) – 3:34
"Deportees" (Woody Guthrie, Martin Hoffman) – 4:03
"There is Power in a Union" (instrumental) (George Root) – 3:16
"The Tracks of My Tears" (Smokey Robinson, Warren Moore, Marvin Tarplin) – 2:56
"Wishing the Days Away" (alternate version) – 2:32
"The Clashing of Ideologies" (alternate version) – 2:52
"Greetings to the New Brunette" (demo version) – 3:57
"A Nurse's Life is Full of Woe" – 2:48
"Only Bad Signs" – 3:10
"Hold the Fort" (traditional) – 1:47

Disc 7 (The Internationale – Original Album / Help Save the Youth of America: Live & Dubious EP / Bonus Tracks)
"The Internationale" (Pierre De Geyter, Billy Bragg) – 3:45
"I Dreamed I Saw Phil Ochs Last Night" (Earl Robinson, Bragg) – 1:27
"The Marching Song of the Covert Battalions" (Bragg) – 3:59
"Blake's Jerusalem" (William Blake, Hubert Parry) – 2:30
"Nicaragua Nicaraguita" (Carlos Mejía Godoy) – 1:06
"The Red Flag" (Jim Connell, traditional) – 3:12
"My Youngest Son Came Home Today" (Eric Bogle) – 3:04
"Introduction" (live) – 0:57
"Help Save the Youth of America" (live) (Bragg) – 2:36
"Think Again" (live) (Dick Gaughan) – 4:21
"Chile Your Waters Run Red Through Soweto" (Bernice Johnson Reagon) – 3:09
"Days Like These" (DC remix) (Bragg) – 2:40
"To Have and to Have Not" (live) (Bragg) – 2:47
"There Is Power in a Union" (with The Pattersons) (Bragg, George F. Root, traditional) – 3:27
"Joe Hill" (Phil Ochs) – 8:23
"This Land Is Your Land" (Woody Guthrie) – 4:35
"Never Cross a Picket Line" (Bragg) – 3:38
"A Change Is Gonna Come" (Sam Cooke) – 3:58
"A Miner's Life" (traditional) – 3:01

Disc 8 (Bonus DVD – Here And There)
East Berlin DDR – February 1986
"There Is Power in a Union" (live) (Bragg, Root, traditional) – 2:35
"Between the Wars" (live) (Bragg) – 2:31

Nicaragua – July 1987
"Nicaragua Nicaraguita" (live) (Godoy) – 1:07

Lithuania USSR – May 1988
"I Heard It Through the Grapevine" (live) (Norman Whitfield, Barrett Strong) – 2:07
"To Have and to Have Not" (live) (Bragg) – 2:21
"The Milkman of Human Kindness" (live) (Bragg) – 2:29
"Island of No Return" (live) (Bragg) – 3:24
"Introduction to Between the Wars" (live) – 3:15
"Between the Wars" (live) (Bragg) – 2:21
"The World Turned Upside Down" (live) (Leon Rosselson) – 3:02
"Levi Stubbs' Tears" (live) (Bragg) – 3:15
"Help Save the Youth of America" (live) (Bragg) – 2:36
"A New England" (Bragg) – 2:04
"Wishing the Days Away" (Bragg) – 4:15
"People Get Ready" (Curtis Mayfield) / "Tupelo Honey" (Van Morrison) – 3:02
"Star" (David Bowie) – 1:56
"A13, Trunk Road to The Sea" (Bobby Troup) – 2:17

Disc: 9 (Boxed Set Bonus DVD – From The West Down To The East)
The South Bank Show, March 1985 (TV Special)
"(intro)" – 0:37
"To Have And To Have Not" – 2:54
"A13, Trunk Road To The Sea" – 5:30
"Island Of No Return" – 4:12
"A Lover Sings" – 3:56
"A New England" – 2:59
"Which Side Are You On?" – 3:12
"Between The Wars" – 2:19

East Berlin DDR, August 1986 (Live Concert)
"(intro)" – 0:13
"Lovers Town Revisited" – 1:16
"Levi Stubbs' Tears" – 3:27
"The World Turned Upside Down" – 3:07
"It Says Here" – 2:16
"Island Of No Return" – 6:48
"Which Side Are You On?" – 2:24
"Love Gets Dangerous" – 2:53
"Richard" – 2:22
"Train Train" – 2:22
"A New England" – 2:33

References

Billy Bragg compilation albums
2006 compilation albums
Yep Roc Records compilation albums
2006 video albums
2006 live albums
Live video albums
Yep Roc Records live albums
Yep Roc Records video albums
Cooking Vinyl compilation albums